Thomas Welsh (born 20 April 1933) is a British former swimmer. He competed in two events at the 1952 Summer Olympics.

References

1933 births
Living people
British male swimmers
Olympic swimmers of Great Britain
Swimmers at the 1952 Summer Olympics
Place of birth missing (living people)